Tŷ-llwyd is a small village in the  community of Beulah, Ceredigion, Wales, which is 71.4 miles (114.8 km) from Cardiff and 191.4 miles (308.1 km) from London. Tŷ-llwyd is represented in the Senedd by Elin Jones (Plaid Cymru) and is part of the Ceredigion constituency in the House of Commons.

References

See also
List of localities in Wales by population

Villages in Ceredigion